
Gmina Gidle is a rural gmina (administrative district) in Radomsko County, Łódź Voivodeship, in central Poland.

Massacre during Second World War

During the German invasion of Poland in 1939, Wehrmacht soldiers murdered 72 civilians from the villages in the region by shooting and throwing people into fire. The murdered included infants, children, the elderly and women.

Villages
The gmina contains the following villages having the status of sołectwo: Borowa, Ciężkowice, Chrostowa, Gidle, Gowarzów, Górka, Graby, Kajetanowice, Kotfin, Ludwików, Michałopol, Piaski, Pławno, Ruda, Stanisławice, Stęszów, Włynice, Wojnowice, Wygoda, Zabrodzie and Zagórze.

There are also 11 villages without sołectwo status: Młynek, Huby Kotfińskie, Niesulów, Skrzypiec, Borki, Spalastry, Górki-Kolonia, Lasek-Kolonia, Zielonka, Strzała, Ojrzeń.

Neighbouring gminas
Gmina Gidle is bordered by the gminas of Dąbrowa Zielona, Kłomnice, Kobiele Wielkie, Kruszyna, Radomsko and Żytno.

References

Gidle
Radomsko County
Massacres in Poland
Germany–Poland relations
World War II crimes in Poland